Joseph Peter Bonikowski (born January 16, 1941) is an American former pitcher in Major League Baseball who played briefly for the Minnesota Twins during the  season. He was born in Philadelphia, Pennsylvania and attended Father Judge High School
 
Bonikowski's professional baseball career lasted seven seasons (1959–1965). During his one MLB campaign, Bonikowski, then 21, posted a 5–7 record with a 3.88 ERA in 30 appearances, including 13 starts, three complete games and one save, giving up 47 runs (four unearned) on 95 hits and 38 walks while striking out 45 in 99⅔ innings of work. He pitched back-to-back complete-game victories on June 2 and June 7, defeating the Washington Senators and Kansas City Athletics.

Bonikowski's minor league record was 40–55 (3.88) in 170 games and 793 innings.

References

External links
, or Retrosheet
Pura Pelota (Venezuelan Winter League)

1941 births
Living people
Atlanta Crackers players
Baseball players from Philadelphia
Charlotte Hornets (baseball) players
Major League Baseball pitchers
Minnesota Twins players
Navegantes del Magallanes players
American expatriate baseball players in Venezuela
Rapiños de Occidente players
Sanford Greyhounds players
Syracuse Chiefs players
Vancouver Mounties players
Wilson Tobs players